Nancy Opoien Rasmussen(born August 11, 1953) is an American politician and a Republican member of the South Dakota House of Representatives representing District 17 since January 11, 2013.

Elections
2012 When District 17 incumbent Democratic Representative Tom Jones ran for South Dakota Senate and Republican Representative Jamie Boomgarden was term limited and retired, Rasmussen was unopposed for the June 5, 2012 Republican Primary; in the three-way November 6, 2012 General election Rasmussen took the first seat with 4,512 votes (35.4%) and Democratic nominee Ray Ring took the second seat ahead of fellow Democratic nominee Marion Sorlien.

References

External links
Official page at the South Dakota Legislature
 

Place of birth missing (living people)
Living people
Republican Party members of the South Dakota House of Representatives
People from Turner County, South Dakota
Women state legislators in South Dakota
1953 births
21st-century American politicians
21st-century American women politicians